Florinda is an oil on canvas painting by German painter and lithographer Franz Xaver Winterhalter. It was completed in 1853 and is now in the Metropolitan Museum of Art in New York, where it is not on display.

The picture depicts the legend of King Roderic of Spain spying on Florinda la Cava and the other palace girls while they bathe in a garden in Toledo, in order to decide the fairest. After Roderic selects and courts Florinda, her father takes revenge by inviting the Moors to invade and conquer Spain.

The painting is a replica of the one displayed at Osborne House which Queen Victoria gave as a birthday present to Prince Albert in 1852.

References

1853 paintings
Paintings in the collection of the Metropolitan Museum of Art
Paintings by Franz Xaver Winterhalter
History paintings